Daniel Vivian Moreno (born 5 July 1999) is a Spanish professional footballer who plays for Athletic Bilbao as a central defender.

Club career
Born in Vitoria-Gasteiz, Álava, Basque Country, Vivian represented CD San Viator, Deportivo Alavés, CD Lakua and CD Ariznabarra before joining Santutxu FC in 2015. He was assigned to Santutxu's Juvenil C squad, managed by Ibai Gómez. In June 2016, he moved to Athletic Bilbao, being initially a member of CD Basconia, the club's farm team in Tercera División.

Vivian made his senior debut on 27 August 2016, starting in a 1–1 away draw against Bermeo FT. He made his debut with the reserves on 15 October of the following year, starting in a 4–1 Segunda División B home routing of Peña Sport.

On 11 August 2020, Vivian renewed his contract until 2023 and was definitely promoted to the first team in La Liga. The following day, however, he was loaned to Segunda División side CD Mirandés for the 2020–21 season.

Vivian made his professional debut on 13 September 2020, starting in a 0–0 home draw against AD Alcorcón. He scored his first goal as a professional the following 12 February, in a 3–3 home draw against Girona FC, and ended the campaign as a starter after contributing with 32 appearances.

Upon returning to the Lions, Vivian was chosen as an immediate first-choice over Unai Núñez by manager Marcelino, and made his top tier debut on 16 August 2021 by starting in a 0–0 away draw against Elche CF. Late in the month, he was definitely registered in the main squad after being assigned the number 12 jersey.

International career
Vivian made his debut for the unofficial Basque Country national team in May 2019, in a 0–0 draw away to Panama for which a small, youthful and inexperienced squad was selected.

Career statistics

Club

References

External links
 
 
 
 
 

1999 births
Living people
Footballers from Vitoria-Gasteiz
Basque Country international footballers
Spanish footballers
Association football defenders
La Liga players
Segunda División players
Segunda División B players
Tercera División players
Deportivo Alavés players
CD Basconia footballers
Bilbao Athletic footballers
Athletic Bilbao footballers
CD Mirandés footballers
Santutxu FC players